Kerry Lynne Bishé (born May 1, 1984) is a New Zealand-born American actress, known for her lead role as Donna Clark in the AMC television series Halt and Catch Fire. Bishé played the lead/narrator role in the final season of the ABC medical sitcom Scrubs and starred in the drama film Argo in 2012.

Early life
Bishé was born in New Zealand. Shortly afterward, the family moved to Glen Ridge, New Jersey, in the United States. She graduated from Montclair Kimberley Academy, where her father, Kenneth Bishé, taught social studies. Bishé studied at Northwestern University.

Career
Bishé toured professionally with Montana Shakespeare in the Parks during the summer of 2004, performing the role of Juliet in Romeo and Juliet. She also appeared in a 2006 production of Eugene O'Neill's The Hairy Ape and in the Roundabout revival of George Bernard Shaw's Pygmalion.

Bishé made her screen debut in 2007 when she portrayed Sarah Rosen in The Half Life of Mason Lake, a low-budget production. After appearances as an extra in the first film adaptation of Sex and the City and The Lucky Ones, and a small role in The Understudy (2008), Bishé was cast in Night Life, a television pilot directed by Scrubs star Zach Braff. The production did not make Bishé well-known, but did introduce her to Braff, with whom she later worked on Scrubs.

In 2009, Bishé had a number of television roles, appearing in an episode of the US version of Life on Mars, an episode of the cable-TV series Royal Pains, and in the lead role in the TV movie made from the failed pilot of the proposed sci-fi series Virtuality.

In December 2009, Bishé took on the lead role on the ABC medical sitcom Scrubs, that of Lucy Bennett, the show's new narrator, taking over from Zach Braff. ABC cancelled the show May 14, 2010. Bishé costarred in the independent movie Nice Guy Johnny (2010) with Edward Burns and Matt Bush. She also played a supporting role in Kevin Smith's horror film Red State (2011) and in Ben Affleck's drama film Argo (2012). In 2013, she costarred with Elijah Wood in the independent film Grand Piano.

From 2014 to 2017, Bishé starred as Donna Clark in the AMC television drama series Halt and Catch Fire. Coincidentally, her character's husband in Halt and Catch Fire is portrayed by Scoot McNairy, who also played her spouse in Argo (2012). In season three of Narcos, she played Cristina Jurado, the American wife of the Cali Cartel's Harvard-educated money launderer Franklin Jurado.

Personal life
Bishé is in a relationship with actor Chris Lowell. The couple has a daughter.

Filmography

References

External links
 
 Dagenais, Marcel, "Bright Young Things: Kerry Bishé", Working Class Magazine, Brooklyn, New York

1984 births
Actresses from New Jersey
American film actresses
American television actresses
Living people
Montclair Kimberley Academy alumni
Northwestern University alumni
21st-century American actresses
Outstanding Performance by a Cast in a Motion Picture Screen Actors Guild Award winners
New Zealand emigrants to the United States
People from Glen Ridge, New Jersey